Thalassocyon tui is a species of medium-sized sea snail, a marine gastropod mollusc in the family Thalassocyonidae.

References 

 Powell A. W. B., New Zealand Mollusca, William Collins Publishers Ltd, Auckland, New Zealand 1979 

Gastropods of New Zealand
Thalassocyonidae
Gastropods described in 1967